Tseng Chia-lin (born 13 December 1981), better known by her stage name Chu Xuan, is a Taiwanese television actress, best known for supporting roles in long-running Hokkien-language soap operas like Taiwan Tornado, I Shall Succeed, Love Above All, My Family My Love, Night Market Life, Feng Shui Family

External links

1981 births
Living people
Taiwanese television actresses
21st-century Taiwanese actresses
Actresses from Taipei